Kumar Basnet (Nepali:कुमार बस्नेत) is a Nepalese folk singer, dancer and song writer. He started performing in his local village as early as 1957, he has been titled 'Nepalese Folk Legend' due to his successful singing career. Basnet, called the Elvis Presley of Nepal, is also popularly known by his comedy folk, satirical singing style, his major hit songs being Lai Bari Lai, Ama Bhanda and Herda Ramo.

Basnet's song Lai Bari Lai was featured in title song of highest grossing Nepalese film Chhakka Panja since the song matches what happens in the film.

Discography 
 Best Of Kumar Basnet
 Naya Koseli
 Madal Ghan – Ghan
 Kumar Dai
 Lok Koseli

References 

20th-century Nepalese male singers
Nepalese folk musicians
Living people
1943 births